Hedgimadra is a village in Thanagundi panchayat, Yadgir Taluka, Yadgir district, in Karnataka state, India. Hedgimadra is sixteen kilometres by road west-northwest of the town of Yadgir. The nearest rail station is Thangunda Railway Station, while the nearest railhead is in Yadgir.

Demographics 
At the 2001 census, Hedgimadra had 1,746 inhabitants, with 895 males and 851 females.

Notes

External links 
 

Villages in Yadgir district